John Gregory Kerr (born October 8, 1947) is a Canadian politician. He was the Member of Parliament for West Nova from 2008 to 2015 and a member of the Nova Scotia House of Assembly from 1978 to 1993.

Early life and education
Born in Annapolis Royal, he graduated from Annapolis Royal Regional Academy. He then graduated from Mount Allison University with a B.A. and B.Ed. After graduation, he taught at Bridgetown Regional High School.

Political career
He represented Annapolis West in the Nova Scotia House of Assembly from 1978 to 1993 as a Progressive Conservative member. Kerr served in the Executive Council of Nova Scotia as Minister of Culture, Recreation and Fitness from 1980 to 1981, as Minister of the Environment from 1981 to 1983, as Minister of Finance from 1983 to 1993, as Minister of Housing from 1988 to 1989 and as Minister of Tourism and Culture from 1992 to 1993. Kerr was defeated when he ran for re-election in the 1993 election. He was an unsuccessful candidate for a seat in the House of Commons in 2006.

He was elected as the Conservative Party Member of Parliament for the electoral district of West Nova in the 2008 federal election. He served in the House of Commons as the Parliamentary Secretary to the Minister of Veterans Affairs.

In April 2014, Kerr announced that he is not running in the 2015 federal election.

Personal life
Kerr married his high-school girlfriend, Marica Longmire in 1970. They live in Granville Centre, Nova Scotia and own a beef farm and logging operation. The couple have two children, Gillian and Megan. He is an active warden in the Anglican Church.

In January 2013, Kerr suffered a stroke.

Electoral record

References

External links
Greg Kerr

Conservative Party of Canada MPs
Members of the House of Commons of Canada from Nova Scotia
Progressive Conservative Association of Nova Scotia MLAs
Members of the Executive Council of Nova Scotia
People from Annapolis County, Nova Scotia
Living people
1947 births
Mount Allison University alumni
21st-century Canadian politicians